Helperthorpe is a village in the Ryedale district of North Yorkshire, England. The village lies in the Great Wold Valley and the course of the winterbourne stream the Gypsey Race passes through it.

History

The village is mentioned in the Domesday Book, where it had five households and a church. It is one of the Thankful Villages that suffered no fatalities during the Great War of 1914 to 1918.

Until 1974 the village lay in the historic county boundaries of the East Riding of Yorkshire. As the village is quite small in population, it is included as part of the Luttons Parish along with East and West Lutton. The population of The Luttons at the 2011 census was 411, with an estimated population of 430 in 2015.

Parish church

The parish church of St Peter was until the late 19th century a medieval building. In 1871–73 it was rebuilt by Sir Tatton Sykes of Sledmere. There are three richly decorated roofs over the nave, chancel and ground floor of the tower (the latter being used as the baptistery). A full set of stained glass windows was supplied by Clayton & Bell but this was replaced less than 20 years later. The irreparably damaged font was buried in the floor below a new one.

Footnotes

External links

Villages in North Yorkshire